Sino-African relations or Afro-Chinese relations are the historical, political, economic, military, social, and cultural connection between mainland China and the African continent.

Little is known about ancient relations between China and Africa, though there is some evidence of early trade connections. Highlights of medieval contacts include the 14th-century journey of Moroccan scholar Ibn Battuta, the 14th-century visit of Somali scholar and explorer Sa'id of Mogadishu and the 15th-century Ming dynasty voyages of Chinese admiral Zheng He.

Modern political and economic relations between mainland China and the African continent commenced in the era of Mao Zedong, following the victory of the Chinese Communist Party (CCP) in the Chinese Civil War. At the turn of the 21st century, the modern state of the People's Republic of China (PRC) built increasingly strong economic ties with Africa. In 2013, it was estimated that one million Chinese citizens were residing in Africa. Additionally, it has been estimated that 200,000 Africans were working in China, in 2017.

In 1971, China received the support from 26 African nations in the UN to take over the seat from Taiwan. Mao Zedong was grateful for the support and said, "It is our African brothers who have carried us into the UN". Today almost all African nations officially recognise the economically larger China (People's Republic of China) over Taiwan in search of economic advantage (aid, trade and FDI).

There have increasingly been closer political, security and economic ties between China and African nations. Trade between China and Africa increased by 700% during the 1990s, and China is currently Africa's largest trading partner. In 2000, the Forum on China–Africa Cooperation (FOCAC) was established as a forum between African countries and China.

Historical relations 

China and Africa have a history of trade relations, sometimes through third parties, dating back as far as 202 BC and 220 AD. Ptolemy, writing in Roman Egypt in the second century, knew of China by two separate routes: the silk road and the Indian Ocean trade. He identified two Chinese peoples: the Seres or silk people and the Sinai of the southern trade, whose name probably derives from the Qin dynasty.

The first mention of Africa in Chinese sources was in the Yu-yang-tsa-tsu by Tuan Ch'eng-shih (died 863), a compendium of general knowledge where he wrote about the land of Po-pa-li (Berbera).

In 1071, an embassy arrived in China from an unidentified East African kingdom. Since it was a formal tribute mission (in the eyes of the Chinese), it is described in the official History of the Song Dynasty. The name of the kingdom was Ts'eng t'an and it was said to lie inland and mint its coin. This name is probably derived from the Persian Zangistan, and the title of its ruler, a-mei-lo a-mei-lan is probably derived from the Persian amir-i-amiran (emir of emirs).

Archaeological excavations at Mogadishu in the Ajuran Empire and Kilwa, Tanzania have recovered many coins from China. The majority of the Chinese coins date back to the Song dynasty, although the Ming dynasty and Qing dynasty are also represented, according to Richard Pankhurst. In 1226, Chao Jukua, the commissioner of foreign trade at Quanzhou in the Fujian province of China, completed his Chu-fan-chih (Description of Barbarous Peoples) which discusses Zanzibar (Ts'ong-pa) and Somalia (Pi-P'a-Lo).

Giraffes, zebras, and incense were exported to the Ming dynasty of China, making Somali merchants leaders in the commerce between Asia and Africa while influencing the Chinese language in Somalia in the process.

In the 14th century, Moroccan traveler and scholar, Ibn Battuta, made a long journey to Africa and Asia. He reached China in April 1345 after a stay in India before serving as an envoy of Sultan Muhammad Tughlaq of the Indian Tughlaq dynasty to China. He wrote:

China is the safest, best regulated of countries for a traveler. A man may go by himself on a nine-month journey, carrying with him a large sum of money, without any fear. Silk is used for clothing even by poor monks and beggars. Its porcelains are the finest of all makes of pottery and its hens are bigger than geese in our country.

The 14th-century visit of Sa'id of Mogadishu, the Somali scholar and explorer was another point of Medieval contact between Africa and China.

The Ming dynasty admiral, Zheng He, and his fleet rounded the coast of Somalia and followed the coast down to the Mozambique Channel. The goal of those expeditions was to spread Chinese culture and display Chinese strength. Zheng brought gifts and granted titles from the Ming emperor to local rulers. In October 1415, Zheng He reached the eastern coast of Africa and sent the first of two giraffes as gifts to the Chinese Yongle Emperor.

Other accounts mention Chinese ships sinking near Lamu Island in Kenya in 1415. Survivors are said to have settled on the island and married local women.

Archaeologists have found Chinese porcelains made during the Tang dynasty (618–907) in Kenyan villages; however, these were believed to have been brought over by Zheng He during his fifteenth-century ocean voyages. On Lamu Island off the Kenyan coast, local oral tradition maintains that twenty shipwrecked Chinese sailors, possibly part of Zheng's fleet, washed up on shore there hundreds of years ago. Given permission to settle by local tribes after having killed a dangerous python, they converted to Islam and married local women. Now, they are believed to have just six descendants remaining there. In 2002, DNA tests conducted on one of the women confirmed that she was of Chinese descent. Her daughter, Mwamaka Sharifu, later received a PRC government scholarship to study traditional Chinese medicine (TCM) in China.

National Geographic published an article by Frank Viviano in July 2005 about his visit to Pate Island. During his time on Lamu, ceramic fragments had been found which the administrative officer of the local Swahili history museum claimed were of Chinese origin, specifically from Zheng He's voyage to East Africa. The eyes of the Pate people resembled Chinese, and Famao and Wei were among the names, which were speculated to be of Chinese origin. Their ancestors were said to have been indigenous women who intermarried with Chinese Ming sailors when they were shipwrecked. Two places on Pate were called "Old Shanga", and "New Shanga", which the Chinese sailors had named. A local guide, who claimed to be of Chinese descent, showed Viviano a graveyard made out of coral on the island, indicating that they were graves of Chinese sailors, which the author described as "virtually identical", to Chinese Ming dynasty tombs, complete with "half-moon domes" and "terraced entries".

Archaeologists have discovered glass beads and porcelain from China inside Great Zimbabwe, a medieval stone city located in present-day Zimbabwe.

According to Melanie Yap and Daniel Leong Man in their book "Colour, Confusions, and Concessions: the History of Chinese in South Africa", Chu Ssu-pen, a Chinese mapmaker in 1320, had southern Africa drawn on one of his maps. Ceramics found in Zimbabwe and South Africa dated back to the Song dynasty. Some tribes to Cape Town's north claimed descent from Chinese sailors during the thirteenth century. Their physical appearance is similar to Chinese with paler skin and a Mandarin-sounding tonal language. Their name for themselves is "abandoned people", Awatwa in their language.

Contemporary relations 

The establishment of modern Sino-African relations began in the late 1950s, when China signed bilateral trade agreements with Algeria, Egypt, Guinea, Somalia, Morocco, and Sudan. Chinese Premier Zhou Enlai made a ten-country tour of Africa between December 1963 and January 1964. Zhou Enlai visited Ghana and established close relations with Kwame Nkrumah, who desired a united Africa. Relations at that time often reflected China's foreign policy in general: China "began to cultivate ties and offer...economic, technical and military support to African countries and liberation movements in an effort to encourage wars of national liberation and revolution as part of an international united front against both superpowers".

Diplomacy 

Early modern bilateral relations were mainly affected by the Cold War and communist ideology. China originally had close ties with the anti-apartheid and liberation movement, African National Congress (ANC), in South Africa, but as China's relations with the Soviet Union deteriorated and the ANC moved closer to the Soviet Union, China shifted away from the ANC towards the Pan-Africanist Congress. The Soviets supported Joshua Nkomo's Zimbabwe African People's Union, and supplied them with arms; Robert Mugabe's attempts to gain Soviet support for his Zimbabwe African National Union were rebuffed, leading him to enter into relations with China. China adopted several principles, among them was the support of the independence of African countries while investing in infrastructure projects.

In the 1970s, the expulsion of Soviet military advisers from Egypt and Sudan was welcomed with arms supplied by China. China and Zaire (and Safari Club) shared a common goal in Africa, namely to do everything in their power to halt Soviet gains in the area. Accordingly, both Zaire and China covertly funneled aid to the National Front for the Liberation of Angola (FNLA) (and later, UNITA) to prevent the People's Movement for the Liberation of Angola (MPLA), which was supported and augmented by Cuba, from coming to power. China and Safari Club sent assistance to support the Mobutu regime during the Shaba I conflict in 1977.

The Somali Democratic Republic established good relations with the Soviet Union throughout the Cold War era. When Somalia sought to create a Greater Somalia, it declared war on Ethiopia and took the Ogaden region in three months with Soviet aid. When the Soviet Union shifted its support from Somalia to Ethiopia, the latter retook the Ogaden. This angered Somalian President, Siad Barre, who expelled all Soviets advisors and citizens from Somalia. China and Safari Club supported Somalia diplomatically and with token military aid.

The Forum on China-Africa Cooperation (FOCAC), first officially held in Beijing in 2006, following two major ministerial conferences in Beijing and Addis Ababa in 2000 and 2003, is a triennial high-level forum between China and the African nations. FOCAC is the primary multi-lateral coordination mechanism between African countries and China.

For a permanent UN seat for Africa, Nigeria, the largest African country, relies on Chinese support while Egypt looks to the U.S. for backing.

In 2022, the African Union announced its move to establish a delegation with a resident Ambassador to Beijing, China.

Recognition of Taiwan 

The question of Taiwan has been a key political issue for the People's Republic of China (PRC). In 1971, the support of African nations was crucial in the PRC's joining the United Nations (UN), taking over the seat of the ROC on Taiwan. Many African countries, such as Algeria, Egypt, Ethiopia, and Zambia have stressed their support for a "one-China policy". Only one African country, Eswatini, still maintains relations with Taipei.

Human rights in Xinjiang 

In July 2019, UN ambassadors of 37 countries, including Algeria, Angola, Cameroon, Congo, DRC, Egypt, Eritrea, Nigeria, Somalia, South Sudan, Sudan, Zimbabwe, and other African states, signed a joint letter to the United Nations Human Rights Council (UNHCR) defending China's treatment of Uyghurs and other Muslim minority groups in the Xinjiang region.

African countries which are members of the UNHCR had a significant impact in narrowly defeating a proposal in October 2022 by that body to debate human rights in Xinjiang. Somalia was the only African UNHCR member voting in favor of debate.

Hong Kong national security law 

In June 2020, 53 countries, mostly in Africa, declared their support for the Hong Kong national security law at the UNHCR.

Economic issues 

China's economic interests in Africa have dramatically increased since the 1990s. In 1980, the total Sino-African trade volume amounted to US$1 billion. In 1999, it was US$6.5 billion and US$10 billion in 2000. By 2005, the total Sino-African trade volume had reached US$39.7 billion before jumping to US$55 billion in 2006, making China the second-largest trading partner of Africa after the United States, which had US$91 billion in trade with African nations. The PRC also passed its traditional African economic partner and former colonial power, France, which had trade worth US$47 billion. In 2010, trade between Africa and China was valued at US$114 billion and US$166.3 billion in 2011. In the first ten months of 2012, it was US$163.9 billion.

Findings from 2017 estimate there are in excess of 10,000 Chinese corporations doing business in Africa, most of which are private companies investing in the infrastructure, energy, and banking sectors. Investments from Chinese entrepreneurial migration have culminated in positive (indirect jobs) and negative (displacing local traders) effects in local African societies.

One-third of China's oil supplies comes from the African continent, mainly from Angola. Investments of Chinese companies in the energy sector reached US$78.1 billion in 2019. In some cases, as in Nigeria and Angola, oil and gas exploration and production deals crossed $2 billion.

In agriculture, Benin and the Sahel countries of Burkina Faso and Mali supply up to 20% of China's cotton needs. While Côte d'Ivoire supplies China with cocoa, from US$39.7 million in 2001 to $113.5 million in 2005, the most significant African provider of coffee is Ethiopia. As for fish products, Namibia remains one of the main providers.

During the year 2011, trade between Africa and China increased a staggering 33% from the previous year to US$166 billion. This included Chinese imports from Africa equaling US$93 billion, consisting largely of mineral ores, petroleum, and agricultural products, and Chinese exports to Africa totaling US$93 billion, consisting largely of manufactured goods. Outlining the rapidly expanding trade between the African continent and China, trade between these two areas of the world increased further by over 22% year-over-year to US$80.5 billion in the first five months of the year 2012. Imports from Africa were up 25.5% to $49.6 billion during these first five months of 2012 and exports of Chinese-made products, such as machinery, electrical and consumer goods and clothing/footwear increased 17.5% to reach $30.9 billion. China has been Africa's largest trading partner since 2009 when it surpassed the United States, and continues to be the largest trading partner as of 2020, albeit with a Coronavirus-induced drop in volume.

The need to protect China's increased investments in Africa has driven a shift away from China's traditional non-interference in the internal matters of other countries to new diplomatic and military initiatives to try to resolve unrest in South Sudan and Mali.

During the December 2015 FOCAC meeting in Johannesburg, South Africa, China's paramount leader Xi Jinping pledged $60 billion over three years in loans and assistance to the African continent. The stated aim of China's effort was to support factories manufacturing goods for export.  Along with roads and ports, Nigerian President Muhammadu Buhari showed his desire to finish stalled railway projects along the coastline, specifically a 1,400 km railway from Lagos to Calabar representing approximately 200,000 jobs.

A 2020 report synthesizing close to a hundred studies on Africa-China economic relations finds that economic engagement with China supported Africa's economic transformation. At the same time, criticism against China has been growing from labour unions and civil society groups about the "poor labor conditions, unsustainable environmental practices, and job displacement" caused by Chinese enterprises. According to RAND, China is also thought to be taking advantage of African governments' weaknesses, thereby encouraging corruption and wasteful decision-making.

Communications infrastructure 
Beginning in the late 1990s, Chinese national champions telecommunications company Huawei built significant amounts of telecommunications infrastructure in sub-Saharan Africa.

To improve commercial relationships and telecommunication services as part of the Belt and Road Initiative (BRI), significant investments in fiber networks have been undertaken. The PEACE Cable (Pakistan & East Africa Connecting Europe) is a 9,300 mile (12,000 km) submarine fiber optic cable owned by a subsidiary of the China-based Hengtong Group and supplied by Huawei Marine. It is expected to reach initial completion in 2021–2022. The Cable's landfall in Pakistan provide for low-latency overland connection to China. The Cable's route is around the Arabian Peninsula, first dividing north into the Red Sea, crossing land in Egypt and then proceeding through the Mediterranean to the Interxion MRS2 Data Center in Marseille, France. The southern fork extends along the east coast of Africa, which in Phase 2 will reach South Africa. Additional landfalls are in Cyprus, Djibouti, Somalia, Kenya, and Seychelles.

In August 2021, China announced more digital projects on the Continent in areas such as the digital economy, smart cities and 5G. These projects are thought to be part of the Digital Africa initiative that was proposed during a trip of Foreign Minister Wang Yi in Africa in 2020.

Aid and loans 

China began its foreign aid program in with assistance to sub-Saharan and Middle Eastern countries.  The first sub-Saharan African country to receive Chinese foreign aid was Guinea; the aid assisted Guinea in building its infrastructure following independence from France.

In the 1960s and 1970s, the Chinese government supported African Independence Movements and gave aid to newly independent African nations. Among the most notable early projects were the 1,860 km TAZARA Railway, linking Zambia and Tanzania, which China helped to finance and build from 1970 to 1975. Some 50,000 Chinese engineers and workers were sent to the continent to complete the project. By 1978, China was giving aid to more African countries than the United States. 

China provides aid in the forms of debt forgiveness, aid grants, concessional loans, and interest-free loans, including through the Forum on China-Africa Cooperation (FOCAC). According to Marxist journalist Martin Jacques in his book When China Rules the World, Chinese aid is "far less restrictive and doctrinaire" and comes with fewer strings attached than Western aid. Unconditional and low-rate credit lines (rates at 1.5% over fifteen years to twenty years) have largely taken the place of more restrictive and conditional Western loans. The sole political condition China requires from aid recipients is recognition of the One China principle.

Following her interviews of African scholars and diplomats, U.S. Professor of International Securities Studies Dawn C. Murphy concludes that many African countries genuinely appreciate this moral stance by China against political conditions for foreign aid.

Estimates regarding the amount of African debt cancelled by China varies. Since 2000, over $10bn in debt owed by African nations to the PRC has been cancelled, according to Le Monde diplomatique. According to a 2020 report by the China Africa Research Initiative, "China has only offered debt write-offs for zero-interest loans", which account for at least $3.4 billion of cancelled debt in Africa between 2000 and 2019.

Scott N. Romaniuk, a researcher at the University of Albertas China Institute, cautioned that Africa should "beware of 'no strings attached'" regarding development financing from China. He said that China's low-interest loans have been used to trade for extraction rights of proven deposits of natural resources, constraining African countries' future use of these resources. Patrick Bond said, "the conditions on Chinese loans and investments become very clear when the recipient countries have a debt crisis".

In 2015, the China Africa Research Initiative identified 17 African countries with loans from China facing potential default. Kenyan economist Anzetse Were has argued that some African nations' narratives of Chinese debt-trap diplomacy stem from a lack of fiscal transparency and a weaker bargaining position vis-à-vis China.

Although several countries express concern that China has been engaging in debt-trap diplomacy to neo-colonise the continent; however, academics including Deborah Bräutigam have disputed those accusations. Following her review of available data, U.S. Air War College Professor Dawn C. Murphy concluded that calling China's behavior in Africa “neocolonial” is “an exaggeration and misrepresentation.”

The China Africa Research Initiative reported that Chinese financiers loaned $153 billion to African public-sector borrowers between 2000 and 2019; at least or over 80 percent of those loans were used for economic and social infrastructure projects in the transport, power, telecom, and water sectors of underdeveloped and developing countries. A 2007 report published by International Rivers said that several infrastructure projects funded by Chinese loans, such as the Merowe Dam, had a positive impact on the economies of African countries.

As of 2021, China is estimated to hold at least 21% of all African debt. In August 2022, the Ministry of Foreign Affairs of the People's Republic of China announced that it would forgive 23 interest-free loans that matured at the end of 2021 to 17 unspecified African countries.

Health care 
China has been engaged in a kind of "health diplomacy" towards Africa since the 1960s. Health care development and medical assistance have been among the chief areas of support. Between the early 1960s and 2005, more than 15,000 Chinese doctors travelled to Africa to help treat patients in more than 47 countries.

In 2001, the member nations of G8 formed the United Nations-backed Global Fund to Fight AIDS, Tuberculosis and Malaria with an initial budget of $10 billion. In 2007, another additional $1.1 billion was approved in Kunming, China, of which 66% was dedicated to Africa. In September of the same year, China promised the Democratic Republic of the Congo to build 31 hospital units and 145 smaller health care centres, a project due to be completed in March 2010.

During the 2014 Ebola epidemic, China provided financial donations, medical supplies and personnel to Sierra Leone, Ghana, Liberia, and Guinea.

China provided vaccines to African countries during the COVID-19 pandemic. As of November 2021, it had supplied 200 million vaccine doses to Africa, pledged to donate 600 million more doses, and pledged a further 400 million doses via other means such as joint Chinese-African production. China also sent medical teams to Algeria, Zimbabwe, and Nigeria.

African Centre for Disease Control 
Under the Belt and Road Initiative, in 2023 the African Union along with the People's Republic of China is slated to open Phase-1 of the African continent's Centres for Disease Control and Prevention (CDCP) complex.

Agriculture 
Since the mid-1990s, China has encouraged its agricultural enterprises to seek economic opportunities abroad as part of its go out policy.

Agricultural Technology Demonstration Centers are a major component of China's agricultural cooperation with African countries. The function of these centers is to transmit agricultural expertise and technology from China to developing countries in Africa while also creating market opportunities for Chinese companies in the agricultural sector. The Chinese government is motivated to establish these centers out of both an ideological commitment to fostering South-South cooperation with less developed countries and by a desire to increase food security.

China first announced its Agricultural Technology Demonstrations Centers at the 2006 meeting of the Forum on China-Africa Cooperation. It launched 19 of these centers between 2006 and 2018, all in sub-Saharan Africa.

Military and intelligence 

Military cooperation goes back to the Cold War period when China was keen to help African liberation movements. Eritrea's first president Isaias Afwerki, a leader in the fight for independence, received military training in China, Apart from some traditional allies such as Somalia and Tanzania, China also had military ties with non-aligned countries like Egypt. Military equipment worth $142 million was sold to African countries between 1955 and 1977. In July 2017, China set up its first overseas military base in Djibouti, which is a small town located in the Horn of Africa between the Gulf of Aden and the Red Sea, as a logistics facility for peacekeeping missions on the continent. Bertil Lintner, as well as various Indian analysts, have described the base in Djibouti as part of China's "String of Pearls" geopolitical and military strategy in the Indian Ocean.

Peacekeeping missions 
In 2004, China deployed around 1,500 military personnel between Liberia and the Democratic Republic of the Congo. Since 2011, it has sent infantry troops describable (arguably) as 'combat' forces.

In July 2007, China supported the passage of UN Security Council Resolution 1769 and contributed troops to African Union-United Nations Hybrid Operation in Darfur (UNAMID). China also has fourteen attachés in fourteen different African countries as of 2007, while eighteen African countries maintain attachés in Beijing.

Arms sales 
An increasing number of African countries have shifted their source of munitions from traditional providers such as Russia to China due to the competitive prices offered by Chinese suppliers. It is estimated that between 2013 and 2017, Chinese arms imports to Africa totaled 17%, representing a 55% increase compared to the period covering 2009 to 2013. It also sold more arms than any other supplier, with sales to 23 African countries.

Arms sales by China to some African states have troubled critics who point out that some buyers like Sudan are accused of war crimes. Chinese drones have proliferated across Africa, and have been utilized in hundreds of attacks in Egypt, Libya, Algeria, Nigeria.

Former U.S. military contractor Erik Prince's Frontier Services Group has close ties to the Chinese state-owned CITIC Group and provides security training services to Chinese firms operating in Africa.

Allegations of espionage 

The African Union headquarters in Addis Ababa was built and fully funded by the Chinese government. The Chinese government was alleged to have spied on the computer servers at the headquarters from 2012 to 2017. Chinese officials and African Union denied the accusation, yet the African Union replaced their servers after the report of backdoor hacks.

Culture 

The first overseas Chinese cultural centre in Africa was opened in Mauritius in 1988. Two others followed in Egypt and Benin. The Confucius Institute has at least 54 locations across Africa, in addition to another 27 Confucius Classrooms in various countries (as of 2018).

Historically, little is known about early African immigration to China. As economic and political ties have strengthened, many Africans have relocated to China to seek better economic opportunities. Places dubbed 'Little Africa' and 'Chocolate City' are increasingly receiving new immigrants, mostly Nigerians. Most African immigrants, an estimated 20,000 individuals, are concentrated in the area of Guangzhou. An estimated 10,000 illegal African immigrants are in China, and police crackdowns have intensified since early 2009.

In contrast, early Chinese immigration to the African continent is slightly better documented. In 1724, a few Chinese convicts were brought as laborers to South Africa from the Dutch East Indies (modern-day Indonesia) by the colonial Dutch Empire. In the early nineteenth century, another wave of immigrants were brought to South Africa by the British to work in agriculture, infrastructure building, and mining. In recent years, there has been an increasing presence of Chinese in Africa with one estimate numbering Chinese nationals at one million.

In 2012, state media broadcaster China Central Television (CCTV) opened its first office in Africa, in Kenya, which is currently called CGTN Africa.

China has also been increasingly involved in sport in Africa. Since 1970, Chinese-owned companies have been building sports stadiums throughout most African countries. Each project costs dozens of millions of dollars, a fee that China gives as a soft loan. The stadiums strengthen China's diplomatic and commercial ties with African countries. African governments accept China's loans because they enable them to promote development projects. On the other hand, concerns have been raised as to the working conditions at these stadiums. Also, some of the stadiums turned out to be white elephants given their meager usage.

Migration

Racism 

Human rights and advocacy groups for Africans in China have criticized the use of blackface performances on Chinese television, particularly on the CCTV New Year's Gala.

The expansion of Chinese companies and their investments in Africa has raised issues of Chinese racism against the local population. For example, after a video shot by a Kenyan worker whose Chinese boss referred to Kenyans as "monkeys"  went viral in 2018, more examples of discrimination by Chinese nationals in the country, such as separated bathrooms, have emerged.

International observers have highlighted the generalised view in China of Africans as "backward or primitive and blackness as unattractive", with racist attitudes specifically on social media going untouched by censorship.

Around April 2020, African nationals in Guangzhou were being evicted from their homes by local police and told to leave, with no place to sleep, amidst some recent Chinese news articles negatively reporting on Nigerians in the city. The reports of discrimination created controversy in Africa damaging Sino-African relations, and sparked a diplomatic crisis, with African governments and diplomats speaking out against the incidents in Guangzhou. The Nigerian legislator Oloye Akin Alabi posted a video of his confronting the PRC's ambassador Zhou Pingjian over the alleged mistreatment of Nigerians in the city. The governments of Ghana, Kenya, and Uganda have also asked for explanations from the PRC government, and the African Union Commission invited the PRC ambassador to the African Union to discuss the mistreatment allegations. The African ambassadors summarised the complaints in an official protest letter demanding the cessation of reported ejection from hotels or apartments, forced testing and quarantine, the seizure of passports, and threats of visa revocation, arrest or deportation of Africans particularly in the Guangdong province.

In response, authorities in Guangdong encouraged foreigners to report instances of discrimination to a 24-hour support hotline and told businesses and rental houses to treat Chinese and foreigners equally. The COVID-19 targeting of Africans had reportedly eased by June 2020.

Criticism 

There are a variety of critical perspectives scrutinizing the balance of power relationship between China and Africa, and China's role concerning human rights in Africa. Increasingly, concerns have been raised by Africans and Western observers that China's relationship with Africa is neocolonialist in nature. As a response to such criticism, China issued the Nine Principles to Encourage and Standardise Enterprises' Overseas Investment, a charter and conduct guide for Chinese companies operating abroad.

In 2002, the Chinese Ministry of Foreign Affairs stated that China and Africa are making "joint efforts to maintain the lawful rights of developing countries and push forward the creation of a new, fair and just political and economic order in the world".

Kenya 

Kenya's relations with China figured prominently in the 2022 Kenyan general election, in which both candidates criticized the country's existing relations with China.

Zimbabwe 
The China-Zimbabwe relationship drew the attention of critics. China was accused of supplying Zimbabwe with jet fighters, vehicles, and other military equipment. China declared in 2007 that it was limiting assistance to humanitarian aid. In July 2008, Chinese diplomatic channels asked Mugabe "to behave", though critics see that as a way for China to protect its interests in this country should a regime change.

War in Darfur 

Another high-profile event of concern for critics of China in Africa was in the run-up to the 2008 Summer Olympics. Human rights groups criticized China for its supportive relationship with the government of Sudan, which had been accused of mass killings in Darfur. China is Sudan's largest economic partner, with a 40% share in its oil, and also sells Sudan small arms. China has threatened to veto UN Security Council actions to combat the war in Darfur. In response, a 2008 editorial in the CCP-owned daily tabloid Global Times stated that "As the Darfur issue is not an internal affair of China, nor was it caused by China, to link the two together is utterly unreasonable, irresponsible and unfair."

Following pressure and criticism from the international community, China appointed a Special Envoy for Africa Issues, Liu Guijin. To facilitate resolution of the Darfur issue, Liu coordinated with the AU, EU, United States, and UN.

Public perception 

In public perception, according to 2011 BBC World Public Opinion poll (PIPA), 5 African countries held mostly favorable views of China which included Kenya (73% positive), Nigeria (85%), Ghana (72%), Egypt (55%) and South Africa (53%). Another BBC survey found that Kenya (77% positive) and Nigeria (82%) held a positive view of the impact of China's growth on their country. In 2013, the PIPA surveys showed positive views towards China in Nigeria (78%), Ghana (68%), however noted a decline in positive views in Kenya to 58%. But 2014 survey later showed an increase in positive public opinion in Kenya (65%), as well as 67% positive opinions in Ghana and an increase to 85% in Nigeria.

In 2022, Bloomberg reported that the past two decades of China's investments into African infrastructure and its supplying of the continent with affordable consumer goods, has made young Africans feel more positive towards China. A survey conducted by the Ichikowitz Family Foundation in June 2022 and which involves lengthy face-to-face interviews, shown that 76% of 4,507 young Africans across 15 African countries had named China as a foreign power with having the biggest positive influence on their lives, surpassing the US and Europe. The positive views toward China was strongest in Rwanda, Malawi and Nigeria. However, 56 percent of those surveyed also believed in an unsubstantiated theory that COVID-19 was created and intentionally spread by China.

According to a 2022 survey funded by the European Regional Development Fund and run by Palacky University Olomouc in collaboration with the Central European Institute of Asian Studies, a slightly larger share of Chinese respondents viewed Africans positively rather than negatively and most respondents favoured friendly rather than tough government policies towards Africa.

See also 

 List of diplomatic missions of China
 List of diplomatic missions of Taiwan
 Sino-Third World relations
 Group of 77

References

Further reading 

 
 Calabrese, Linda (ed.) (2016). China-Africa: a maturing relationship? Growth, change and resilience London: DFID-ESRC Growth Research Programme.

 Donou-Adonsou, Ficawoyi, and Sokchea Lim. "On the importance of Chinese investment in Africa." Review of development finance 8.1 (2018): 63–73. Online
 Fasan, Rotimi. "African Studies and Sino-Africa Collaborations: Towards Our “Common Interest”." Journal of African Cultural Studies 33.2 (2021): 194-200. 
 Fasan, Olu. "Like the West, Africa must be guarded in its relations with China." Africa at LSE (2017). online

 Gunessee, Saileshsingh, and Shuang Hu. "Chinese cross‐border mergers and acquisitions in the developing world: Is Africa unique?." Thunderbird International Business Review 63.1 (2021): 27–41.  Online

 Isaksson, Ann-Sofie, and Andreas Kotsadam. "Chinese Aid to Africa: Distinguishing Features and Local Effects." (2020). Online
 Isaksson, Ann-Sofie, and Andreas Kotsadam. "Racing to the bottom? Chinese development projects and trade union involvement in Africa." World Development 106 (2018): 284–298. Online on lower wages
 Jedlowski, Alessandro. "Chinese Television in Africa." Theory, Culture & Society (2021): 02632764211012033.
 de Moraes, Isaías Albertin, and Mônica Heinzelmann Portella de Aguiar. "China-Africa Relations in Political Economy of the World-System: in between excluding-insertion and including-insertion." Relações Internacionais no Mundo Atual 4.29 (2021): 119–146. online

 Ofosu, George, and David Sarpong. "The evolving perspectives on the Chinese labour regime in Africa." Economic and Industrial Democracy (2021): 0143831X211029382. online
 Otele, Oscar M. "Introduction. China-Africa Relations: Interdisciplinary Question and Theoretical Perspectives." The African Review 47.2 (2020): 267–284. online

 Tan-Mullins, May, Frauke Urban, and Grace Mang. "Evaluating the behaviour of Chinese stakeholders engaged in large hydropower projects in Asia and Africa." The China Quarterly 230 (2017): 464–488. Online

\
 Wasserman, Herman, and Dani Madrid-Morales. "How influential are Chinese media in Africa? An audience analysis in Kenya and South Africa." International Journal of Communication 12 (2018): 20+ online.

 
Foreign relations of China
Foreign relations of Taiwan